This is a list of awards and nominations received by American actor Sam Rockwell. In 2017, Rockwell's performance as a troubled police deputy in the crime-drama Three Billboards Outside Ebbing, Missouri won the Academy Award for Best Supporting Actor, a Golden Globe and two Screen Actors Guild Awards. In 2018, his portrayal of George W. Bush in the biopic Vice earned him his second Academy Award nomination in the same category.

Major associations

Academy Awards

British Academy Film Awards

Primetime Emmy Awards

Golden Globe Awards

Screen Actors Guild Awards

Tony Awards

Festival awards

Berlin International Film Festival

Other awards and nominations

Australian Academy of Cinema and Television Arts Awards

Alliance of Women Film Journalists

Austin Film Critics Association

Award Circuit Community Award

Boston Film Festival

Boston Society of Film Critics

British Independent Film Awards

Capri-Hollywood Film Festival Award

Central Ohio Film Critics Association Awards

Chicago Film Critics Association

Chlotrudis Award

Critics' Choice Movie Awards

Critics' Choice Super Awards

Critics' Choice Television Awards

Dallas–Fort Worth Film Critics Association

Denver Film Critics Society

Detroit Film Critics Society

Dorian Awards

Florida Film Critics Circle

Georgia Film Critics Association

Gold Derby Awards

Golden Schmoes Award

Gotham Awards

Hawaii Film Critics Society

Hollywood Film Awards

Houston Film Critics Society

IMDb Award

Independent Spirit Awards

IndieWire Critics Poll

International Online Cinema

Iowa Film Critics

Irish Film & Television Academy

Italian Online Movie Award

Las Vegas Film Critics Society

London Film Critics' Circle

Los Angeles Film Critics Association

Montreal World Film Festival

National Society of Film Critics

Nevada Film Critics Society

Newport Beach Film Festival

North Carolina Film Critics Association

North Texas Film Critics Association

Oklahoma Film Critics Circle

Online Film & Television Association

Online Film Critics Society

Outer Critics Circle Awards

Palm Springs International Film Festival

Phoenix Critics Circle Award

Phoenix Film Critics Society

San Diego Film Critics Society

San Francisco Film Critics Circle

Satellite Awards

Saturn Awards

Scream Awards

Seattle Film Critics Society

Seattle International Film Festival

Sitges Film Festival

Southeastern Film Critics Association

St. Louis Film Critics Association

Sundance Film Festival

Toronto Film Critics Association

Utah Film Critics Association

Vancouver Film Critics Circle

Village Voice Film Poll

Washington D.C. Area Film Critics Association

See also
 Sam Rockwell filmography

References

External links
 

Rockwell, Sam